Baana Kaathadi is a 2010 Indian Tamil-language romance film written and directed by Badri Venkatesh. The film stars newcomer Atharvaa, son of Tamil actor Murali, makes his debut in the film, and Samantha. Featuring music scored by Yuvan Shankar Raja, cinematography by Richard M. Nathan and editing by Suresh Urs, the film, which was launched in March 2009, released on 6 August 2010. It is the last movie of Murali, who made a special appearance in this movie, before his death in September 2010. The movie received critical acclaim and an above average success at the box office . The music of the film was a major hit .

Plot 
One day, in his rush to grab hold of a falling kite, Ramesh (Atharvaa) bumps into Priya (Samantha), a fashion technology student. In the process, her pendrive falls into his pocket, without either of them realising. The pendrive consists of six months' worth of Priya's project work, and she needed to submit it. Asking the principal for an extension, Priya searches for Ramesh and manages to find him. She humiliates him, while he denies that the pendrive is with him. After college one day, Ramesh and his friends see Priya on the road. They tease and infuriate her, eventually leading to her slapping him.

A few days later, while Ramesh's mother (Mounika) is washing his pants, she finds the pendrive. Ramesh realizes that the fault is his and immediately goes to return the pendrive. Priya is impressed with his attitude, as she had expected him to keep the pendrive because she slapped him. This marks the beginning of their friendship. As time passes, Priya and Ramesh become closer. Urged by his friends, Ramesh goes to tell Priya that he loves her. However, while asking for money from his friend Kumar (Karunas), he accidentally takes the condom from Kumar's pocket. When Ramesh sees the condom, he tries to hide it from Priya. However, just then, the police arrives, and he is forced to drop it. Priya sees the condom and is shocked. She denies knowing Ramesh, resulting in him being taken to the police station.

Ramesh is finally brought home and refuses to talk to Priya. His friends try to talk to her, but she does not listen. However, when her friend tells her how much Ramesh actually loves her, she is finally convinced. Ramesh had actually bought Priya a grain of rice with her name written on it. Priya thus realizes that she also loves Ramesh and begins trying to get him to accept her. However, he refuses to accept her as he believes that she thinks of him as lower-class.

In a subplot, Ramesh witnesses a murder committed by the local gangster "Maanja" Ravi (Prasanna). In shock, Ramesh runs away and eventually trips over an elderly man. The next day, Ravi sends Ramesh to Gujarat, as he fears for his safety. A few days later, the deceased's son appears in the commissioner's office with the elderly man, who claims that he can identify the boy who ran into him. Apparently, the deceased is an ex-MLA, and the commissioner decides to deal with the matter himself. The inspector warns Ravi and his gang, implying to them that the witness should be killed.

Meanwhile, Priya receives a call from her mother telling her that her father is going for surgery and asks her to return to the US. Priya tells Ramesh that she will be waiting at the bus stop the next day, at the same place where they first met. If he loves her, he would come. The next day, eventually being coaxed by Kumar, Ramesh goes to see her. On the way, Ravi tries to kill him, but his conscience gets the better of him. However, he also knows that there is another goon in the same bus as Priya waiting to kill Ramesh. Ramesh manages to stand in front of Priya, and they hold hands for a while. Ramesh then slips off the steps and is run over by the bus. His mother, friends, and Priya mourn his death, while the goon who was supposed to kill him slips away.

The movie ends with Priya in a car, looking at the grain of rice that has her name on it which Ramesh presented to her for her birthday.

Cast 

 Atharvaa as Ramesh
 Samantha as Priya
 Karunas as Kumar
 Mounika as Ramesh's mother
 Rajendran as Gang Leader
 Manobala as Conductor
 T. P. Gajendran as Kumar's father
 Udayaraj as Ramesh's friend
 Alex
 Imman Annachi
 Prasanna as "Maanja" Ravi (cameo appearance)
 Murali as 'Idhayam' Raja (guest appearance)
 Debi Dutta in an item number

Production 
On 9 March 2009, the film's launch took place at AVM Studios in Vadapalani in Chennai, which was attended by the entire cast and crew and other prominent film personalities actor Murali and producer S. A. Chandrasekhar. A major portion of the film is said to have been shot at the International Kites Festival of Gujarat, which would be the first time in the history of Tamil cinema.

Soundtrack 

Baana'''s soundtrack is composed by Yuvan Shankar Raja. The soundtrack album, which was released on 30 April'10 at Sathyam Cinemas in Chennai, features 5 songs, 4 of which being solo numbers. However, contrary to earlier reports, the album didn't feature a remix of the Ilaiyaraaja song "Aathadi Paavadai" from the film Poovilangu that starred Adharva's father Murali. Na. Muthukumar wrote the lyrics for two songs, while Vaali, Snehan and Gangai Amaran each penned one song. All songs received positive comments and became hit instantly.

ReceptionTimes of India wrote "Clearly the screenplay hasn’t played out all that smoothly. The kite could have soared, but falters and dips too often". Behindwoods'' wrote "Director Badri Venkatesh could have handled the script a lot better. With a powerful production house and lots of talent at his disposal, he could easily have given much more powerful presentation. The screenplay does not demand attention at all and hence it is hard to hide a feeling of saturation when you are watching the movie".

References

External links
 

2010 films
2010s Tamil-language films
Films scored by Yuvan Shankar Raja
2010 directorial debut films